Mollinedia longicuspidata is a species of plant in the Monimiaceae family. It is endemic to Brazil.

References

longicuspidata
Endemic flora of Brazil
Flora of the Atlantic Forest
Endangered plants
Endangered biota of South America
Taxonomy articles created by Polbot